The Colombo central bus station bombing was the car bombing of the central bus terminal of Colombo carried out on April 21, 1987 in Pettah, Colombo, Sri Lanka. The  bomb killed at least 113 people  and left a  crater in the ground. The New York Times estimated 200 people had been injured.

The bombing, which was chosen specifically to land on the time of the day in order to harm as many people as possible, produced an enormous explosion that could be heard ten miles away. Six buses were trapped in the attack, causing numerous passengers to die in the fire as their buses burned. Heavy rainfall delayed rescue workers from arriving to the scene at time. Heaps of victims, including old people and children lay on the ground in agony before they were received by authorities.

The Bank of Ceylon was also heavily damaged during the attack.

Aftermath 
After the bombing, strict security measures were undertaken, including a curfew on the entire district, and the army prevented people from entering the areas affected by the attack.

In the immediate aftermath, Sinhalese mobs rioted across the streets of Colombo, pulling over cars to see if there were Tamils inside. Sri Lankan police led a massive intervention against rioters after some started stoning Tamil-owned stores, leading to heavy police presence in every corner of the city. The riots were eventually dispersed.

See also 
 1997 Colombo World Trade Centre bombing
2008 Sri Lanka bus bombings

References

External links 
 BBC On This Day – Tamil Tigers blamed for bus garage blast

1987 murders in Sri Lanka
Central Bus Station bombing
April 1987 crimes
April 1987 events in Asia
Attacks on buildings and structures in Sri Lanka
Attacks on bus stations
Attacks on civilians attributed to the Liberation Tigers of Tamil Eelam
Building bombings in Sri Lanka
Car and truck bombings in Sri Lanka
Explosions in 1987
Central Bus Station bombing
Liberation Tigers of Tamil Eelam attacks against buses
Liberation Tigers of Tamil Eelam attacks in Eelam War I
Massacres in Sri Lanka
Mass murder in 1987
Central Bus Station bombing
Mass murder of Sinhalese
Central Bus Station bombing
Terrorist incidents in Sri Lanka in 1987